The 2021 WPA World Ten-ball Championship was a professional pool tournament for the discipline of ten-ball organised by the World Pool-Billiard Association (WPA) and CueSports International. It was the sixth WPA World Ten-ball Championship and the first since 2019, as the 2020 edition was canceled due to the COVID-19 pandemic.

The tournament began with 64 players in a double-elimination bracket (playing race-to-8 matches) until 16 players remained, at which point it changed to a single-elimination format (playing race-to-10 matches). Eklent Kaçi of Albania defeated Naoyuki Ōi of Japan in the championship match.

References

2021
WPA World Ten-ball Championship
WPA World Ten-ball Championship
International sports competitions hosted by the United States
Cue sports in the United States
Sports competitions in Las Vegas
WPA World Ten-ball Championship
WPA World Ten-ball Championship